The Pathfinder: Buried Treasures – The Mid-70's Recordings is a 2010 compilation album composed of the three studio albums recorded by Buffy Sainte-Marie during her time with MCA Records and ABC Records.

Covering the years between 1974 and 1976, the material includes all tracks from Buffy (1974), Changing Woman (1975) and Sweet America (1976) but is not presented in the chronological order of those album's initial release.  The compilation is a reissue of the 2008 Big Beat 2 CD set Buffy/Changing Woman/Sweet America: The Mid-70's Records which used similar artwork (a photo of originally used on the rear cover of Sweet America) and had the songs sequenced in their original album order.

The Pathfinder received a positive review from The Province, which gave it an A rating, stating that the set "...captures the period when Sainte-Marie both cemented her reputation as an arresting performer of utterly unique style as well as a protest singer of exceptional power."

Track listing

References

External links
Discogs
Official album page
interview about compilation with Sainte-Marie

2010 compilation albums
Buffy Sainte-Marie albums